The year 1951 in archaeology involved some significant events.

Excavations
 c. January - Old Furnace, Coalbrookdale, England.
 Awwam temple near Ma'rib in Yemen, by Wendell Phillips of the American Foundation for the Study of Man (continues to 1952).
 Stanwick Iron Age Fortifications in North Yorkshire, by Mortimer Wheeler (continues to 1952).
 Hod Hill in Dorset, by Ian Richmond for the British Museum (continues to 1958).
 Tasghîmût fortress in Morocco, by Charles Allain and Jacques Meunié.
 Excavation of Chogha Zanbil in Iran by Roman Ghirshman begins.

Explorations
 1951–1952 - British Academy Middle Nile Expedition in Sudan led by O. G. S. Crawford.

Finds
 May 12 - Gunnister Man found in a peat bog in Shetland.

Events
 July - The term "Industrial archaeology" is first used in print in Britain.
 The Durrës Archaeological Museum is established in Durrës, Albania.

Publications
 Social Evolution, by V. Gordon Childe (1892–1957), Australian-born archaeologist.
 The Prehistory of Wales, by W. F. Grimes (1905–1988), Welsh archaeologist.
 A Land, by Jacquetta Hawkes (1910–1996), British archaeologist.

Births
 Keith Muckelroy, British maritime archaeologist (d. 1980)

Deaths
 February 28 - Maud Cunnington, British archaeologist (b. 1869)

References

Archaeology
Archaeology
Archaeology by year